Canica is a private holding company, based in Oslo, Norway, created to own the RIMI grocery store chain, owned by Stein Erik Hagen (10%) and his three children Caroline Marie Hagen, Carl Erik Hagen and Nina Camilla Hagen (30% each). The company is the largest owner of Orkla (17.4%), Jernia (100%), Komplett (56.21%), Ignis and Steen & Strøm (49.9%). The company was founded in 1985 to own the RIMI grocery store chain that Hagen had started. This was sold to ICA in 2004.

Holding companies of Norway
Companies established in 1985
1985 establishments in Norway